Pithanus maerkelii is a species of plant bug in the family Miridae. It is found in Europe, but occurs in the Mediterranean basin only on the western northern edge.  To the east spreads across the Palearctic to European Russia and Ukraine. It is an adventive species in North America.

Pithanus maerkelii  is found on Poaceae, Cyperaceae and Juncaceae-  Agrostis , Festuca,  Nardus ,  Deschampsia , Carex ,  Scirpus,  Juncus.  They suck on the stalks (knots) and also on the ears (ovules).

References

Further reading

External links

 

Articles created by Qbugbot
Insects described in 1838
Stenodemini